My Secret Identity is a Canadian television series starring Jerry O'Connell and Derek McGrath that originally aired on CTV. It premiered on October 9, 1988 and ended on May 25, 1991, with a total of 72 episodes over the course of 3 seasons.

Series overview

Episodes

Season 1 (1988–89)

Season 2 (1989–90)

Season 3 (1990–91)

External links

Lists of science fiction television series episodes
Lists of Canadian children's television series episodes